Isocyanic acid is a chemical compound with the structural formula HNCO, which is often written as . It is a colourless, volatile and poisonous substance, with a boiling point of 23.5 °C. It is the predominant tautomer and an isomer of cyanic acid (aka. cyanol).

The related functional group  is isocyanate; it is distinct from cyanate, fulminate, and nitrile oxide.

Isocyanic acid was discovered in 1830 by Justus von Liebig and Friedrich Wöhler.

Isocyanic acid is the simplest stable chemical compound that contains carbon, hydrogen, nitrogen, and oxygen, the four most commonly found elements in organic chemistry and biology. It is the only fairly stable one of the four linear isomers with molecular formula HOCN that have been synthesized, the others being cyanic acid (cyanol) and the elusive fulminic acid and isofulminic acid .

Structure
Although the electronic structure according to valence bond theory can be written as H−N=C=O, the vibrational spectrum has a band at 2268.8 cm−1 in the gas phase, which clearly indicates a carbon–nitrogen triple bond. Thus the canonical form  is the major resonance structure.

Properties

Physical
The pure compound has a melting point of −86.8 °C and a boiling point of 23.5 °C, so it is volatile at ambient temperatures.

Acidity
In aqueous solution it is a weak acid, having a pKa of 3.7:
HNCO <=> H+ + NCO-

Decomposition
Isocyanic acid hydrolyses to carbon dioxide and ammonia:

HNCO + H2O -> CO2 + NH3

Oligomerization
At sufficiently high concentrations, isocyanic acid oligomerizes to give the trimer cyanuric acid and cyamelide, a polymer.  These species usually are easily separated from liquid- or gas-phase reaction products.  Cyanuric acid itself decomposes on further heating back to isocyanic acid.

Stability in solution
Dilute solutions of isocyanic acid are stable in inert solvents, e.g. ether and chlorinated hydrocarbons.

Reactions
Isocyanic acid reacts with amines to give ureas (carbamides):
HNCO + RNH2 -> RNHC(O)NH2
This reaction is called carbamylation.

HNCO adds across electron-rich double bonds, such as vinylethers, to give the corresponding isocyanates.

Isocyanic acid, HNCO, is a Lewis acid whose free energy, enthalpy and entropy changes for its 1:1 association with a number of bases in carbon tetrachloride solution at 25 °C have been reported. The acceptor properties of HNCO are compared with other Lewis acid in the ECW model.

Tautomerism
The tautomer, known as cyanic acid, HOCN, in which the oxygen atom is protonated, is unstable to decomposition, but in solution it is present in equilibrium with isocyanic acid to the extent of about 3%. The vibrational spectrum is indicative of the presence of a triple bond between the nitrogen and carbon atoms.

Low-temperature photolysis of solids containing HNCO creates the tautomer cyanic acid , also called hydrogen cyanate. Pure cyanic acid has not been isolated, and isocyanic acid is the predominant form in all solvents. Sometimes information presented for cyanic acid in reference books is actually for isocyanic acid.

Preparation
Isocyanic acid can be made by protonation of the cyanate anion, such as from salts like potassium cyanate, by either gaseous hydrogen chloride or acids such as oxalic acid.

H+ + NCO- -> HNCO

HNCO also can be made by the high-temperature thermal decomposition of the trimer cyanuric acid:

C3H3N3O3 -> 3 HNCO

In the reverse of the famous synthesis of urea by Friedrich Wöhler,
CO(NH2)2 -> HNCO + NH3
isocyanic acid is produced and rapidly trimerizes to cyanuric acid.

Occurrence
Isocyanic acid has been detected in many kinds of interstellar environments.

Isocyanic acid is also present in various forms of smoke, including smog and cigarette smoke. It was detected using mass spectrometry, and easily dissolves in water, posing a health risk to the lungs.

See also 
 Cyanate
 Thiocyanic acid

References

External links
 
 Cyanic acid from NIST Chemistry WebBook (accessed 2006-09-09)

Acids
Cyanates
Hydrogen compounds
Inorganic carbon compounds
Isocyanates